Kangkar LRT station (SE4) is an elevated Light Rail Transit (LRT) station on the Sengkang LRT line East Loop in Rivervale, Sengkang, Singapore along Rivervale Drive near the junction of Rivervale Walk. This station is located near Rivervale Plaza and 3 condominiums, namely Park Green, Riversound Residence and Austville Residences.

Etymology
The station is located at a former fishery and was a familiar landmark to older generation of the residents. Kangkar means "river bank" or "river mouth" in Teochew and Hokkien (Min Nan) respectively.

History
The station opened on 18 January 2003, along with the rest of the Sengkang LRT line East Loop.

References

External links

Railway stations in Singapore opened in 2003
LRT stations in Sengkang
Light Rail Transit (Singapore) stations